Sainte-Geneviève-de-Berthier is a municipality in the Lanaudière region of Quebec, Canada, part of the D'Autray Regional County Municipality. It is crossed by the river La Chaloupe. The Saint-Joseph River also passes over 2.1 km in the southwestern part of the municipal territory.

It is home to the Sainte-Geneviève church which forms an enclave within the city of Berthierville belonging to Sainte-Geneviève-de-Berthier. The church was classified as a heritage site in 2001 and is named in honor of Saint Genevieve. Is is also home to the Grandchamp covered bridge which is recognized as a listed heritage asset and the Grande Côte Road witch is known for its large ancestral houses.

Neighborhoods
Berthier County
Paquin
Rivière-Bayonne
Ruisseau des Terres-Noires

History
Originally, the territory were Sainte-Geneviève-de-Berthier currently sit was known as Berthier, en haut. On July 1, 1849. the municipality of Berthier numéro un was created, witch consisted of most of the current D'Autray RCM. In 1852, the future town of Berthierville (then known only as Berthier) split from the municipality and on July 1, 1855, the municipality disband entirely, creating 8 new town: Saint-Antoine-de-la-Valtrie, L'Isle-du-Pads, Saint-Barthélemi, Saint-Joseph-de-Lanoraie, Saint-Gabriel-de-Brandon, Sainte-Elizabeth, Saint-Cuthbert and Berthier-en-Haut, which, on March 13, 1969, changed its name to the current Sainte-Geneviève-de-Berthier in honor of Saint Genevieve the patroness saint of Paris.

Demographics

Population

Language
Mother tongue:
 English as first language: 0.7%
 French as first language: 96.7%
 English and French as first language: 0%
 Other as first language: 2.6%

Education

The Sir Wilfrid Laurier School Board operates anglophone public schools, including:
 Joliette Elementary School in Saint-Charles-Borromée
 Joliette High School in Joliette

See also
List of municipalities in Quebec

References

External links

Incorporated places in Lanaudière
Municipalities in Quebec